The Indian Tolls (Army & Air Force) Act, 1901 is a Law enacted by the Parliament of India and introduced by the Ministry of Defence to deal with exemption of toll charges where applicable for regular armed forces including all family members of Indian Armed Forces extending from Indian Army to Central Armed Police Forces. In the wake of new legislation and policy formulation, the act was later revised by the Ministry of Road Transport and Highways to disassociate the exemptions for family members from the provision of section 3 and 4 and those only "on duty" would be entitled for the exemption and does not pertain to the retired personnel.

Purpose
The purpose of Indian Tolls (Army and Air Force) Act, 1901, extends to the entire territories and states administered by India.
As stated in the revised Act, there will not be exemption available when traveling in personal vehicles, even used for official purposes like discharging an armed official for duty.
All regular or in-service officers (except retired personnels) ranking from juniors to seniors when proceeding to during duties or returning from on-duty, whether they belong to Navy, Air force, or land-based branch are liable to exempt for all tolls, except "certain tolls for the transit of barges".

Penalty
Any person whether they are road and transport officials or belonging to their respective branches of Road tax, if demands toll exempted in provisions of section 3 or section 4 "shall be punishable with fine which may extend to fifty rupees".

Compensation
If compensation claims are made by any owner, company, railways administration or local authority for any loss alleged to have been incurred to the operation of this Act, the claim shall be submitted to the central government.

References

Ministry of Defence (India)
Acts of the Parliament of India 1901
Acts of the Parliament of India
Toll (fee)